Carol H. Beck Gold Medal (defunct) was a prestigious art prize awarded for the best oil portrait by an American artist submitted to the Pennsylvania Academy of the Fine Arts's annual exhibition. It was named for PAFA alumna and painter/writer/critic Carol H. Beck (1859–1908), whose brother James M. Beck founded the award in her memory. The portrait had to have been painted within the prior three years, and an artist could be awarded the medal only once. 

The first Beck Gold Medal was awarded in 1909. Recipients included John Singer Sargent, Robert Henri, George Bellows, John Sloan and Thomas Hart Benton. The last was awarded in 1968. Beginning in 1969, the annual exhibitions were dedicated exclusively to student work from PAFA's school.

Recipients

See also
 Temple Gold Medal
 Mary Smith Prize
 Widener Gold Medal

References

Beck
Beck
Awards established in 1909
Awards disestablished in 1968